Cyclin-dependent kinase 4 inhibitor D is an enzyme that in humans is encoded by the CDKN2D gene.

The protein encoded by this gene is a member of the INK4 family of cyclin-dependent kinase inhibitors. This protein has been shown to form a stable complex with CDK4 or CDK6, and prevent the activation of the CDK kinases, thus function as a cell growth regulator that controls cell cycle G1 progression. The abundance of the transcript of this gene was found to oscillate in a cell-cycle dependent manner with the lowest expression at mid G1 and a maximal expression during S phase. The negative regulation of the cell cycle involved in this protein was shown to participate in repressing neuronal proliferation, as well as spermatogenesis. The expression of this gene and its protein product (p19) is observed in neurons with neurofibrillary tangles (NFTs) and it is suggested as a marker for senescent neurons. Two alternatively spliced variants of this gene, which encode an identical protein, have been reported.

Note, this protein should not be confused with p19-ARF (mouse) or the human equivalent p14ARF, which are alternative products of the CDKN2A gene.

References

Further reading

External links
 
 
 

Cell cycle regulators